In Greek mythology, Pharis (Ancient Greek: Φᾶριν means 'plough') was the son of Hermes and the Danaid Phylodameia, and founder of Pharae in Messene. He had one daughter, Telegone, who consorted with the river god Alpheius and had by him a son Ortilochus (Orsilochus), who in his turn became father of Diocles, and Diocles had twin sons Crethon and Orsilochus, who fought at Troy and were killed by Aeneas.

Pausanias leaves open the question whether Pharae in Achaea were founded by this Pharis (spelled "Phares" in this particular passage) or by someone else.

Notes

References 

 Homer, The Iliad with an English Translation by A.T. Murray, Ph.D. in two volumes. Cambridge, MA., Harvard University Press; London, William Heinemann, Ltd. 1924. . Online version at the Perseus Digital Library.
 Homer, Homeri Opera in five volumes. Oxford, Oxford University Press. 1920. . Greek text available at the Perseus Digital Library.
 Pausanias, Description of Greece with an English Translation by W.H.S. Jones, Litt.D., and H.A. Ormerod, M.A., in 4 Volumes. Cambridge, MA, Harvard University Press; London, William Heinemann Ltd. 1918. . Online version at the Perseus Digital Library
 Pausanias, Graeciae Descriptio. 3 vols. Leipzig, Teubner. 1903.  Greek text available at the Perseus Digital Library.

Children of Hermes